Giuseppe Artale (Mazzarino, 29 August 1632 – Naples, 11 February 1679) was a Sicilian poet, novelist, and duelist, known for his Marinist works. He was also a knight of the Constantinian Order of Saint George.

Biography 
Giuseppe Artale was born at Mazzarino, a town of Sicily, in the year 1628. He entered the army at the age of fifteen years, and rendered himself conspicuous by his bravery. He was made captain of the guard to the palatine Ernest of Brunswick-Lüneburg, and was highly esteemed by the emperor Leopold. He distinguished himself in the Cretan War against the Ottoman Empire, and was made a knight of the Constantinian Order of Saint George, with permission to add the imperial eagle, or Double-headed eagle, to his family arms. As a swordsman he was unrivalled, and was commonly known by the appellation of the sanguinary knight, conferred upon him for his success as a well practised duelist. He died at Naples in 1679, worn out by excess.  Artale was a member of the principal academies of Italy, and enjoyed considerable reputation as a poet. He is known today for his heroic romance Cordimarte (1660), and his Enciclopedia poetica (1679), recognised as the last flowering of the pessimistic vein of Neapolitan Marinism.

Works 

 Dell’Enciclopedia Poetica parte prima, Perugia, 1658; Venice, 1660 and 1664.
 Dell’Enciclopedia parte seconda; ovvero la Guerra fra i vivi e morti, Tragedia di lieta fine ; e Il Cor di Marte, historia favoleggiata, Venice, 1660; the fifth edition was published at Naples, 1679.

Notes

Bibliography

External links 
 
 Works of Artale at Italian Wikisource

Writers from Sicily
Italian male poets
Knights Hospitaller
People from the Province of Caltanissetta
1632 births
1679 deaths
Baroque writers
Italian duellists